Sennoy is a rural locality (a selo) in Temryuksky District of the Krasnodar Krai, Russia. Population:

References 

Rural localities in Krasnodar Krai